Ashenafi (Amharic: አሸናፊ) is an Ethiopian Amharic name that may refer to
Ashenafi Bekele, Ethiopian football manager 
Ashenafi Kebede (1938–1998), Ethiopian composer, conductor, musicologist and music educator
Girma Ashenafi (born 1982), Ethiopian football player
Meaza Ashenafi (born 1964), Ethiopian lawyer 
Senait Ashenafi (born 1966), Ethiopian-born actress
Tewodros Ashenafi (born 1969), Ethiopian entrepreneur

Amharic-language names